Stuart Betts McIver (December 25, 1921 – April 24, 2008) was a historian who authored 14 books and many magazine and newspaper articles. His written work was often related to Florida and included Touched by the Sun (Florida Chronicles) and Death in the Everglades about the murder of  conservation pioneer Guy Bradley. He was also scriptwriter and director of documentary films. He appeared as himself in City Confidential, Season 1, Episode 12 "Ft. Lauderdale: Sin in the Sun". He served six years on the board of the Broward County Historical Commission.

McIver was born December 25, 1921, in Sanford, North Carolina, where his father was a country doctor. He studied journalism at the University of North Carolina and started his career writing for newspapers at The Greensboro Daily News, Charlotte News and Baltimore Sun. He met his wife at the Sun in 1948 and the couple moved from Maryland to Jupiter, Florida in 1962 and to Broward County in 1969.

At the Sun Sentinel he wrote a Sunday column titled "The Way We Were" for 15 years. McIver was fond of the Florida Everglades where he hiked, canoed and camped.

Bibliography
 Death in the Everglades: The Murder of Guy Bradley, America's First Martyr to Environmentalism. Gainesville, FL: University Press of Florida, 2003. .
 William J. Ridings, Jr., and Stuart B. McIver. Rating the Presidents: A Ranking of U.S. leaders, from the Great and Honorable to the Dishonest and Incompetent (2000)
 (19 September 1993). "1926 Miami: The blow that broke the boom". South Florida Sun-Sentinel. Retrieved 21 June 2008.
 Dreamers, Schemers and Scalawags. Sarasota, Florida: Pineapple Press Inc., (1998. ) (1994. )
 Hemingway's Key West
 One Hundred Years on Biscayne Bay. Coconut Grove, FL: Biscayne Bay Yacht Club, 1987.
 Yesterday's Palm Beach. Miami: E. A. Seemann, 1976.

References

External links 
  archived 2009-06-19
 

1921 births
2008 deaths
20th-century American historians
American male non-fiction writers
American male journalists
20th-century American journalists
American magazine writers
Writers from North Carolina
People from Sanford, North Carolina
20th-century American male writers
University of North Carolina alumni